CSO or C.S.O. may refer to:

Occupations
 Chief scientific officer
 Chief Scientist Office of the Scottish government
 Chief security officer
 Chief services officer
 Chief Signal Officer (U.S. Army)
 Chief strategy officer
 Chief sustainability officer
 Combat systems officer (U.S. Air Force)
 Community service officer
 Police community support officer
 Sales manager (chief sales officer)
 Chief of Space Operations, the head of the United States Space Force

Orchestras
 Canberra Symphony Orchestra
 Canton Symphony Orchestra
 Carmel Symphony Orchestra
 Charleston Symphony Orchestra
 Charlotte Symphony Orchestra
 Chicago Symphony Orchestra
 Christchurch Symphony Orchestra
 Cincinnati Symphony Orchestra
 Colorado Symphony Orchestra
 Columbia Symphony Orchestra
 Columbus Symphony Orchestra

Organizations
 Bureau of Conflict and Stabilization Operations, at the US Department of State
 Centers for Space Oceanography
 Central Statistical Organisation, India
 Central Statistics Office (Ireland)
 Central Statistics Organization, Afghanistan
 Civil society organization
 Coastal States Organization
 Conference of Solidarity Support Organizations
 Czech Statistical Office

Other
 .CSO, compressed file format for ISO disc images
 Caltech Submillimeter Observatory, Mauna Kea, Hawaii
 Carbonyl sulfide
 CCSO Nameserver
 Colour-separation overlay, an alternative term for chroma key visual processing
 Combined sewer overflow
 Composante Spatiale Optique, a 2019 French spy satellite
 Compulsory stock obligation
 Computer Science Ontology
 Counter-Strike Online, a Free MMOFPS made by Nexon 
 CSO Online, an online publication (Computer Security Online)
 Magdeburg–Cochstedt Airport in Saxony Anhalt, Germany (IATA airport code CSO)

See also
 Central Statistical Office (disambiguation)
 Central Statistics Office (disambiguation)
 Court security officer (disambiguation)